Sar Tappeh or Sartappeh or Sartapah may refer to:
Sar Tappeh, East Azerbaijan
Sar Tappeh, Golestan
Sartapah, Kermanshah
Sar Tappeh-ye Olya, Lorestan Province
Sar Tappeh-ye Sofla, Lorestan Province